Rostov-on-Don Airport Aeroport Rostov-na-Donu  was an international airport located  east of the city of Rostov-on-Don, in southern Russia. It was one of the largest airports in the south-west of Russia and the 12th busiest in the country. It was founded in 1925 and was designated an international airport in 1986. The airport served 50 destinations in Russia and abroad and hosted 30 airlines in 2015. It was a hub for Donavia. In 2015, Rostov Airport handled 2.06 million passengers, including 565 thousand on international routes.

All regular and charter flights were transferred to Platov International Airport by 7 December 2017 11:00. By 1 March 2018 the old airport was scheduled to be officially closed. As of 2021, the airport was closed for further demolition.

History
In 1925, an airfield was constructed near Rostov-on-Don. A house for the airport's head and the staff, as well as fuel storage facilities, were constructed there. A paved road connected the airport with the city. On 15 June 1925 the first route (Rostov-Kharkov-Oryol-Moscow) was launched. During the first three months, only 80 passengers were serviced, but in those days it was considered a success. In 1926, Rostov became a stopover for a high-demand route from Moscow to Tiflis. In the 1930s, the first terminal building was constructed. During World War II the airport was destroyed.

In the post-war years, Rostov airport had to be restored from the ruins. The current airport terminal was constructed in 1977. In 1986, Rostov was designated an international airport, and scheduled international flights were launched in 1991. In 1992, the airport joined Airports Council International, the worldwide professional association of airport operators.

In 2006–2007, modernization and expansion (for 200 more seats) of the international sector of the airport was carried out, including the installation of new passenger elevators and escalators as well as new luggage conveyor and equipment for customs control. In 2007, a renewed VIP hall was opened. In 2009, a new flight information system with 49 monitors was installed. The airport's security was upgraded, including the installation of a new CCTV system and screening equipment at the terminal's entrances. In 2012, the airport's catering service was upgraded to provide up to 3,000 flight meals a day.

In 2007, passenger traffic exceeded 1 million people, and by 2013 this number had doubled. In 2014, Rostov Airport was taken over by Airports of Regions, the largest airport operator in Russia.

The new Platov International Airport was constructed for the upcoming 2018 FIFA World Cup. All flights from the current airport were transferred to the new facility on 7 December 2017.

Infrastructure 
The airport met International Civil Aviation Organization 4D standards. The minimum visibility for take-off was 200 m.

The airport was certified to handle aircraft up to the size of the Airbus A321 and Boeing 767, as well as any types of helicopters.

It could serve 600 passengers per hour on domestic routes, and 450 passengers per hour on international routes.

Airlines and destinations

There are no longer regular flights at the airport. The last regular flight was made on 7 December 2017 by Aeroflot to Saint Petersburg. The airport was scheduled to be fully closed on 1 March 2018, but during the 2018 FIFA World Cup it worked as a spare runway and/or during emergency situations.

Statistics

Annual traffic

Incidents and accidents 

On 19 March 2016, at 3:42 am local time, Flydubai Flight 981, a Boeing 737-800 on a passenger flight from Dubai, while executing a go-around, crashed at a high angle and speed by the end of Runway 22. All 62 people aboard died in the crash. The crash damaged  of the airport's only runway and destroyed ten runway lights. The airport was closed down for several days for the air crash investigation's field survey and the runway repair. The circumstances and reasons of the crash were determined by the Russian Interstate Aviation Committee (IAC), with the participation of the airline's specialists and foreign experts, who continue the investigative actions into the airport.

On 26 November 2019, the IAC published the final report stating that the crash was caused by an incorrect aircraft configuration and incorrect crew piloting, and the subsequent loss of the pilot-in-command's situational awareness in nighttime instrument meteorological conditions. The incorrect configuration refers to performing the go-around procedure with retracted landing gear and flaps but with the maximum available thrust consistent with the Windshear Escape Maneuver combined with a light aircraft that led to a substantial excessive nose-up moment.

References

External links

Rostov-on-Don Airport official website

Defunct airports
Airports built in the Soviet Union
Airports in Rostov Oblast
Airports established in 1925
1925 establishments in Russia
Airports of Regions
Transport in Rostov-on-Don